Gottlob Friedrich Thormeyer (23 October 1775 - 11 February 1842) was a German representative of neoclassical architecture.

Life and artwork

Education and early work
Thormeyer was born in the Protestant Kreuzkirche parish, Dresden. He started to study painting in very early years at the Dresden Academy of Fine Arts under Giovanni Battista Casanova, but changed to architecture in 1791. Friedrich August Krubsacius and Gottlob August Hölzer were his professors there. Since 1800, he belonged to the royal staff as Hofbaukondukteur. Thormeyer created some well known drawings depicting sights of Dresden and its surrounding, e.g. Dom Meißen, Schloss Pillnitz and Katholische Hofkirche (drawn 1807). Many of them were later etched by Christian Gottlob Hammer. Some neo-classical buildings arose in little towns and villages around Dresden, like the Vorwerk Kleindrebnitz.

Traces of the War of the Sixth Coalition 
King Frederick Augustus I of Saxony appointed Thormeyer royal court architect in 1812. Afterwards, Thormeyer went on a study trip, which led him e.g. to Switzerland and Italy, thus avoiding direct involvement in the War of the Sixth Coalition. The portrait above was drawn by Carl Christian Vogel von Vogelstein during Thormeyer's stay 1813 in Rome. Many of his works, however, are in close connection to this war: 
 1812: Etching of the decoration on occasion of the visit of Napoleon to Dresden
 1814: Design of memorials for Jean Victor Moreau in Dresden and Theodor Körner in Wöbbelin
 1815 - 1818: Rebuilding of Bischofswerda, burned down during occupation by Napoleonic troops.

Reconstruction of Dresden 
After the war, Thormeyer led the demolishing of the historical fortification in Dresden as architect in-chief. This reconstruction was finished in 1830, integrating the baroque city center with the surrounding and thus creating room for Dresden to grow rapidly during the following decades. In 1814, Russian governor Nikolai Grigorjewitsch Repnin Wolkonski ordered the long-planned outside-staircase to Brühl's Terrace, Thormeyer's best-known masterpiece. About 1823, Thormeyer accomplished the classicizing tower of the Annenkirche, a church of the late baroque era. Moreover, he initiated a memorial statue of Frederick Augustus I of Saxony, finally designed by Ernst Friedrich August Rietschel.

External links

 "G. F. Thormeyer", Lexicon Upper Lusatian science society
 Objects referring to Thormeyer at Europeana

Further reading
 Georg Kaspar Nagler: Neues allgemeines Künstler-Lexicon. E. A. Fleischmann, 1848. 
 Allgemeines Lexikon der bildenden Künstler von der Antike bis zur Gegenwart: Unter Mitwirkung von etwa 400 Fachgelehrten. Ed.: Ulrich Thieme, Hans Vollmer, Felix Becker. Seemann Leipzig, Vol. 33., 1939. 
 Frank Fiedler, Uwe Fiedler: Lebensbilder aus der Oberlausitz: 60 Biografien aus Bautzen, Bischofswerda und Umgebung. Books on Demand, 2017, pp. 354–367 (Digitalisat in the Internet Archive)

1775 births
1842 deaths
19th-century German architects
Architects from Dresden
People from the Kingdom of Saxony
German neoclassical architects